In archaic law, a computo was a writ, thus called from its effect, which was to compel a person to yield his accounts. It was made and enforceable against the following persons:
executors of executors
the guardian in socage, for waste such as major dilapidations made or suffered in the minority (under legal age period) of the heir
a bailiff
a chamberlain
a receiver 

Writs
Legal documents with Latin names